Mesoamerican cuisine – (covering Belize, El Salvador, Guatemala, Honduras, Nicaragua, northern Costa Rica and Mexico) has four main staples: maize (many varieties based on what climate it is grown in), beans, squash and chili. Other plant-based foods used include: amaranth, avocado, cassava, cherimoya, chia, chocolate, guava, nanche, pineapple, sapodilla, sweet potatoes, yucca and zapote.

Historically, various methods and techniques were employed to store, prepare and preserve the foods, most of which remain in use today. Hernán Cortés introduced rice and wheat to Mesoamerica, prior to which time milpa (known as the cornfield) was one of the main sources of sustenance.

Some traditional foods featured in the cuisine include: Atole (a drink made using masa) and Chocolate Atole (with the addition of chocolate) also known as champurrado. Two classic maize dishes are: boiling maize in water and lime, mixing with chili peppers and eating as gruel; dough preparation for flat cakes, tamales and tortillas. Edible foam is another popular food item, sometimes even regarded as sacred.

While squashes were cooked for food, dried gourds were repurposed for storage or used during battles with embers and chilies, wrapped in leaves and used as chemical warfare.

History 

 7200 BCE: use of chilies 
 6,700 BCE: harvesting and teosinte planting
 4000 BCE: use of squash 
 2000 BCE: cultivation began
 1500 BC: chocolate with the Olmec civilization in Mesoamerica.

Animals 
The animals used in Mesoamerican cuisine were mainly dogs, turkeys and the Muscovy duck.

Chocolate 
The Mesoamericans began making fermented drinks using chocolate in 450 BC using the Theobroma cacao (cocoa tree). Once sugar was used to sweeten it rather than spices, it gained popularity and was used in feasts. Toasted cacao beans were ground (sometimes with parched corn) and then the powder was mixed with water. This was beaten with a wooden whisk until foamy. Vanilla orchid pods or honey were used as flavor enhancers. Chocolate was also seen as an energy drink and a libido increaser as recorded by Moctezuma II who drank 50 cups a day from a golden goblet.

References 

Belizean cuisine
Guatemalan cuisine
Mexican cuisine
Honduran cuisine
Salvadoran cuisine
Nicaraguan cuisine
Costa Rican cuisine
Central American cuisine